Diagrapta is a genus of moths of the family Erebidae. The genus was erected by George Hampson in 1926.

Species
Diagrapta albipunctata Warren, 1889
Diagrapta bellula Schaus, 1913
Diagrapta laminata Butler, 1879
Diagrapta lignaria Felder, 1874
Diagrapta oxydercina Hampson, 1926

References

Calpinae